The NSW Tertiary Student Rugby League is an affiliated body of the New South Wales Rugby League, established to promote the development of Rugby League within Universities, TAFE and other Tertiary Institutes within the state of NSW.

Formed in late 1969, the NSW Tertiary Student Rugby League came about when the Sydney University, Macquarie University, University of NSW and University of Newcastle Rugby League clubs joined to create their own competition that was not restricted by the same boundaries as other senior open age competitions within Sydney.

In 2009 the NSW Tertiary Student Rugby League had 12 clubs from Sydney, Bathurst, Canberra and Newcastle, making it one of the most geographically spread competitions under the New South Wales Rugby League.

History

Arnold Stehr Tertiary Nines
The Tertiary Nines was an annual pre-season competition run by the NSW Tertiary Student Rugby League to kick start the Tertiary League season.

Tertiary Championship: First Division
The original competition set up by the NSW Tertiary Student Rugby League back in 1970, the Tertiary League is the premier week-to-week competition run in NSW for University, TAFE and other Tertiary college students.

Bill Buckley Memorial Trophy: Second Division
With a significant influx of teams joining the NSW Tertiary Student Rugby League after the competition was originally created, it was deemed that in 1973 a Second Division competition would be created.  The competition has been run every year since.

* Bill Buckley Memorial Trophy 3rd v 4th Play-off match

John Pollard Trophy: Third Division
The NSW Tertiary Student Rugby League operated a Third Division competition from 1981 to 2004.  Originally the Third Division was operated as a completely separate competition from First and Second Division, however after the Super League war when a number of Tertiary institutes stopped playing Rugby League, the Third Division was made up of teams who failed to make the Second Division finals.

NSW Tertiary Representative Matches
The Annual City v Country clash gives a chance for some of the best players from the NSW Tertiary Student League competition to battle it out for the City/Country Shield.

Clubs
Twelve clubs from Sydney, Bathurst, Canberra Newcastle have confirmed their participation in the 2009 New South Wales Tertiary League season.

Renamed Clubs
The following teams have changed their names over their life in the NSW Tertiary Student Rugby League:

 Cumberland Beavers (Formerly: Cumberland College)
 Macquarie Warriors (Formerly: Macquarie Treefrogs)
 TAFE NSW Polecats (Formerly: Catholic College of Education, Polding College Polecats, ACU Castle Hill Polecats, UWS Nirimba Polecats, Norwest Polecats, WSI TAFE Polecats)
 University of Canberra Cows (Formerly: Canberra Skolars, now play in the Canberra Raiders Cup)
 UTS Tigers (Formerly: UTS Bulls, UTS Jets)
 Railcorp Apprentices (Formally Public Transport Commission Apprentice College, State Rail Apprentice College).

Former clubs
The following Tertiary Institutes participated in one of the NSW Tertiary Student Rugby League competitions in the past:

 Alexander Mackie Teachers' College
 Hornsby TAFE (Also known as: Hornsby Technical College)
 Macquarie University
 Mount Saint Mary College
 North Sydney TAFE (Also known as: North Sydney Technical College)
 NSW Institute of Technology
 Sydney University Vet Science (Merged with Sydney University)
 Teachers Club
 University of New South Wales (Now play in the South Sydney District League)
 University of Technology, Kuring-gai (Also known as: Kuring-gai CAE)
 University of Western Sydney, Nepean (Also known as: Nepean CAE, Kingswood)
 Wollongong University (Now play in the Illawarra District League)

See also

Universities Rugby League Queensland

Tertiary League Governing Bodies
 NSW Tertiary Student Rugby League Official Site
 Universities Rugby League Queensland Official Site
 Australian Universities Rugby League Official Site
 2008 Tertiary Student Rugby League World Cup

References

External links

Rugby league governing bodies in New South Wales
Rugby league in Sydney
Rugby league competitions in New South Wales
Recurring sporting events established in 1970
1970 establishments in Australia
Sports leagues established in 1970
Sport at Australian universities
University and college rugby league